Leo Lake is a small glacial lake approximately  northeast of Bakers Narrows which drains into Thompson Lake. It is part of the Nelson River watershed, in the Hudson Bay drainage basin in the Northern Region of Manitoba, Canada.

Description
The lakes sits in Churchill River Upland portion of the Midwestern Canadian Shield forests and is surrounded by mixed forest with stands of black spruce, white spruce, jack pine, and trembling aspen. The shoreline is poorly drained areas of muskeg.

Name
The name was officially adopted in 1979.

Canoe Route
The route begins and ends at Bakers Narrows and from Leo lake there are portages north to Alberts Lake and south to Flintoba Lake.

See also
List of lakes of Manitoba

References

Lakes of Northern Manitoba
Glacial lakes of Manitoba